William S. Gailmor (28 April 1910 – 14 November 1970) was a medical writer and lecturer.

References

1910 births
1970 deaths
20th-century American physicians